CJN or cjn may also refer to:

Canadian Jewish News
IATA code for Cijulang Nusawiru Airport
Cam Newton, American National Football League quarterback.